Elstead is a civil parish in Surrey, England with shops, houses and cottages spanning the north and south sides of the River Wey; development is concentrated on two roads that meet at a central green. It includes Pot Common its southern neighbourhood. Hamlets in the parish, marginally separated from the village centre, are Charleshill and Elstead Common, both rich in woodland.

History
Elstead's relative prosperity over the centuries can be partly attributed to the existence of the availability of a site for a watermill and a bridge over the river; parts of the bridge are dated to around 1300.

The first known reference to Elstead is in the 1128 foundation charter for Waverley Abbey (sometimes spelt Waverly), where it was called Helestede. The church of St James was built around ten years later. It still contains 13th-century windows and some 14th-century timbers and is a Grade II* listed building.

In the 14th century, the Scheduled ancient monument bridge was built over the River Wey. Today this old bridge, strengthened by Surrey County Council in 1993, takes the westward traffic; eastward traffic takes the new bridge alongside.

Elstead had a forge built in 1686 which is now an office.

Elstead Mill, now a pub restaurant, was occupied by Oliver Cromwell’s ‘roundhead’ army during the English Civil War but subsequently burnt down. The present structure is described in its listing as being the result of several re-buildings from the 16th century.

There were two other pub restaurants in 2021, The Woolpack and The Golden Fleece, reflecting the early dependence on the local wool trade, also in 2021 three cafe's and a fish & chip shop.

During the 18th and 19th centuries, Elstead was known for the quality and quantity of carrots grown there, with daily shipments by train from nearby Milford Station up to London's Covent Garden market during the growing season. This is attributed to the light sandy soils in the village which are excellent for carrot growing.

In 1997 a millennium oak was planted at the southern apex of the village green under the auspices of the afternoon WI.

Geography

Elstead is surrounded by woods and heathland, including Royal Common, Ockley Common, Elstead Common and Hankley Common, which is used by the British Army for training purposes and by others as a filming location. Much of the heathland area has environmental protection for rare birds, insects and reptiles.

Thundry Meadow, close to Elstead, is a Site of Special Scientific Interest (SSI) and is an important breeding area for the dragonfly and damselfly.

The area around the village has several large farms and much of the land is used for grazing for horses and cattle.

Elstead is within the Green Belt and is in an Area of Outstanding Natural Beauty. It is a popular destination for walkers and cyclists.

Charleshill
The western hamlet Charleshill, is on the opposite (left) bank of the River Wey on the B3001 to Farnham, half of the hamlet being in Tilford. Its public house is The Donkey originally called The Half-way House. The pub was converted from two small cottages in 1850, which at that time were owned by Farnham United Brewery. It acquired the nickname of "The Donkey", as before the days of motor traffic, donkeys were kept tethered outside the Inn to help horses and carts up the hill;  it officially became named this in 1947.

Demography and housing

The average level of accommodation in the region composed of detached houses was 28%, the average for apartments was 22.6%.

The proportion of households in the civil parish who owned their home outright compares to the regional average of 35.1%.  The proportion who owned their home with a loan compares to the regional average of 32.5%.  The remaining % is made up of rented dwellings (plus a negligible % of households living rent-free).

Sports and facilities

The Elstead Village Tennis Club was formed in 1989 and now has five floodlit all weather courts and a clubhouse with parking.

Elstead Cricket Club, founded in the 1880s, are based in the self-built pavilion on the Thursley Road recreation ground.

Elstead Royal British Legion has a club house. There is a bowling green, an activity hall, and an outbuilding used as a commercial cafe.

The village hall plays host to the Elstead Badminton Club every Tuesday evening.

Elstead Sharks are the junior football club and the Elstead Marathon has been held for over 100 years.

Elstead pancake race is held on a convenient day, near to Shrove Tuesday.

Elstead Paper Boat Race is held every year in early July. Boats built to hold children and adults race on The Moat, a pond on Elstead Common.

Pubs and Bars

Elstead has three pubs. The Golden Fleece, and The Mill  are both on the Farnham Road. The Woolpack is on the Village Green. Both the Royal British Legion Branch and the cricket pavilion, The Pav, are on the Thursley road.

Notable residents
John Black Atkins, journalist
Sir Francis Fogarty, RAF Air Chief Marshal
William Fraser, 3rd Baron Strathalmond
Michael Gove, Conservative Party politician
Austin Playfoot, who carried the Olympic torch in 1948 and 2012
Sir John Sunderland, former President of the CBI
Peter Thomas, Baron Thomas of Gwydir, former Secretary of State for Wales

References

External links

Elstead Village Website
Elstead Parish Council
Elstead Independent News

Villages in Surrey
Borough of Waverley
Civil parishes in Surrey